Joseph "Colonel Joe" Henry Thompson (September 26, 1871 – February 1, 1928) was a highly decorated World War I veteran, recipient of the Medal of Honor, lawyer, Pennsylvania state senator, head football coach of the University of Pittsburgh Panthers, and College Football Hall of Fame inductee.

College years

Geneva College
Thompson came to the United States from Ireland in 1898 at the age of 18 and entered Geneva College that year. He immediately became a basketball star and also participated in gymnastics and wrestling, but did not go out for football until 1900. He served as Geneva's player-coach for three years, with his football teams compiling a 27–2–3 record.

University of Pittsburgh
Thompson continued his education at the University of Pittsburgh, then called the Western University of Pennsylvania, where he played football from 1904 and 1906, during which time the Panthers compiled a 26–6 record. He captained the Pitt football team to its first perfect season in 1904 when the Panthers won all ten games and surrendered only one touchdown. Thompson graduated from Pitt in 1905 and continued on with post-graduate work in the School of Law completing his law degree. While at Pitt he was a member of the Phi Gamma Delta fraternity.

Professional life

Coaching
Following graduation from Pitt's law school, Thompson assumed the head coaching position at Pitt from 1909 to 1912, during which period he led Pitt to a 22–11–2 record. The highlight of his coaching tenure was the 1910 season in which Pitt went undefeated and unscored upon and was considered by many to be that season's national champion. While compiling its 9–0 record, Pitt outscored its opponents 282–0. During this time, he attended the University of Pittsburgh School of Law, graduating in 1909, and was admitted to the bar.

A song to Thompson was written to honor him as football coach at Pitt. Entitled "Joe Thompson" it was sung to the tune of the American folk song "Old Black Joe" by Stephen Foster.

Who plans the plays to spring upon the foe?
Who fought for Wup, five years or more ago?
Who's still for Pitt, does anybody know?
Just hear those loyal rooters shouting:
Joe! Joe! Joe!
REFRAIN.
We're coming, we're coming;
We have the foe in tow,
So here's a cheer for Pittsburgh dear
And Joe! Joe! Joe!

While at Pitt, Thompson also coached the track and field team beginning in 1904. At various points, he also coached football at Pittsburgh High School and Carnegie Technical Schools—now known as Carnegie Mellon University—and was Rochester High School's first football coach.

Politics and law
Thompson represented the 47th District as a member of the Republican Party in the Pennsylvania State Senate from 1913 to 1916 and practiced law in Beaver Falls, Pennsylvania until his death in 1928 from ailments aggravated by war wounds.

Hall of Fame
Thompson was inducted into the National Football Foundation's College Football Hall of Fame in 1971 and has been inducted into the Beaver County Sports Hall of Fame in 1977.

Military service

Thompson enlisted in the Pennsylvania National Guard's Company H, 14th Infantry Regiment on February 16, 1905. He was promoted to second lieutenant on November 1, 1906; to captain in Company B, 10th Infantry, Pennsylvania National Guard on December 16, 1909; to major on June 29, 1912; to lieutenant colonel on October 28, 1918; and finally to colonel on March 15, 1919. While serving in WWI he was wounded four times: on September 29, 1918; September 30, 1918; October 1, 1918; and again on October 1, 1918, when he was gassed. He remained on duty after each instance. As of April 12, 1919, he was commanding the 110th Infantry Regiment. Thompson initially returned to the United States on May 11, 1919. He returned to France in June 1919, in order to redeploy the 110th Infantry Regiment to the United States. He was discharged from active duty in December 1919.

While serving in France with the 110th Infantry, then Major Thompson was awarded the Distinguished Service Cross for his valor on October 1, 1918, during which action he was wounded for the fourth time. This decoration was subsequently upgraded to the Medal of Honor on October 5, 1925. His four wounds entitled him to wear four wound chevrons (the precursor to the Purple Heart which was reestablished by the President of the United States per War Department General Orders 3, 1932) on his uniform's lower right sleeve.

Medal of Honor citation
Rank and organization: Major, U.S. Army, 110th Infantry, 28th Division. Place and date: At Apremont, France; October 1, 1918. Entered service at: Beaver Falls, Pa. Born: September 26, 1871; Kilkeel, County Down, Ireland. General Orders: War Department, General Orders No. 21 (October 5, 1925).

Citation:

Counterattacked by two regiments of the enemy, Major Thompson encouraged his battalion in the front line by constantly braving the hazardous fire of machineguns and artillery. His courage was mainly responsible for the heavy repulse of the enemy. Later in the action, when the advance of his assaulting companies was held up by fire from a hostile machinegun nest and all but one of the six assaulting tanks were disabled, Major Thompson, with great gallantry and coolness, rushed forward on foot three separate times in advance of the assaulting line, under heavy machinegun and antitank-gun fire, and led the one remaining tank to within a few yards of the enemy machinegun nest, which succeeded in reducing it, thereby making it possible for the infantry to advance.

Military awards
Thompson's military decorations and awards include:

Head coaching record

College football

See also
 List of Medal of Honor recipients

References

External links
 
 

1871 births
1928 deaths
United States Army colonels
Military personnel from County Down
19th-century Irish people
American men's basketball players
Carnegie Mellon Tartans football coaches
Geneva Golden Tornadoes men's basketball coaches
Geneva Golden Tornadoes men's basketball players
Geneva Golden Tornadoes football players
Pittsburgh Panthers football coaches
Pittsburgh Panthers football players
Pittsburgh Panthers track and field coaches
Player-coaches
High school football coaches in Pennsylvania
College Football Hall of Fame inductees
United States Army personnel of World War I
Basketball coaches from Pennsylvania
Basketball players from Pennsylvania
Irish-born Medal of Honor recipients
Irish people of World War I
Irish soldiers in the United States Army
Recipients of the Croix de Guerre 1914–1918 (France)
Recipients of the Distinguished Service Cross (United States)
United States Army Medal of Honor recipients
World War I recipients of the Medal of Honor
Republican Party Pennsylvania state senators
People from Beaver Falls, Pennsylvania
People from County Down
People from Kilkeel
Players of American football from Pennsylvania
Irish emigrants to the United States (before 1923)
American military personnel killed in World War I